Bashi (also Romanized as Bāshī) is a village in Delvar Rural District, Delvar District, Tangestan County, Bushehr Province, Iran. At the 2006 census, its population was 708, in 166 families.

References 

Populated places in Tangestan County